Palazzia ausonia is a species of sea snail, a marine gastropod mollusk, unassigned in the superfamily Seguenzioidea.

Description
The shell grows to a height of 0.7 mm.

Distribution
This bathyal species occurs in the Mediterranean Sea; in the Atlantic Ocean off the Rockall Trough, Iceland and Western Norway.

References

 Gofas, S.; Le Renard, J.; Bouchet, P. (2001). Mollusca, in: Costello, M.J. et al. (Ed.) (2001). European register of marine species: a check-list of the marine species in Europe and a bibliography of guides to their identification. Collection Patrimoines Naturels, 50: pp. 180–213
 Warén A., 1991: New and little known mollusca from Iceland and Scandinavia; Sarsia 76: 53–124

External links
 

ausonia
Gastropods described in 1988